Sykia  is a village and a community of the Elassona municipality. Before the 2011 local government reform it was a part of the municipality of Potamia, of which it was a municipal district. The 2011 census recorded 525 inhabitants in the village and 624 in the community. The community of Sykia covers an area of 36.806 km2.

Administrative division
The community of Sykia consists of two settlements:
 Kalyvia Analipseos and
 Sykia.

Economy
The population of Sykia is occupied in animal husbandry and agriculture (tobacco, viticulture and olivess).

Population
According to the 2011 census, the population of the settlement of Sykia was 525 people, a decrease of almost 23% compared with the population of the previous census of 2001.

See also
 List of settlements in the Larissa regional unit

References

Populated places in Larissa (regional unit)